IAA may refer to:

Science and Medicine
 Indole-3-acetic acid, a plant hormone
 Aux/IAA repressors, a class of early auxin responsive transcription factors in plants
 Insulin autoantibody, used in diagnosing Latent autoimmune diabetes
 Interrupted aortic arch, a medical condition
 Instituto de Astrofísica de Andalucía, for the (IAA-CSIC) research institute in Spain
 Iodoacetamide, an alkylating agent
 Isoamyl alcohol, a common name for 3-Methylbutan-1-ol
 Independent Ambulance Association representing private ambulance services in the United Kingdom

Aviation
 Igarka Airport IATA code
 Indianapolis Airport Authority
 Iran Aseman Airlines, an Iranian airline
 Irish Aviation Authority
 Israel Airports Authority
 International Academy of Astronautics

Automobile 

 International Motor Show Germany, known natively as Internationale Automobil-Ausstellung

Computing
 Interactive Achievement Awards, now known as D.I.C.E. Awards

Education
 Idyllwild Arts Academy, a private high school in Idyllwild, California
 Intercollegiate Athletic Association, former name of the National Collegiate Athletic Association
 Interlochen Arts Academy, a boarding school at the Interlochen Center for the Arts
 Inter-American Academy of Guayaquil, an international school in Ecuador

Politics
 Information Affairs Authority of Bahrain

Sports
 International Ammunition Association

Associations
 Academia Sinica Institute of Astronomy and Astrophysics, a research institute in Taiwan
 Illinois Agricultural Association
 Immigration Appellate Authority (UK)
 Indian Association of Alberta
 Institute for Applied Autonomy
 Instituto de Arqueología Amazónica, archeological research institute in Peru
 Instituto de Astrofísica de Andalucía, research institute funded by the Spanish government
 International Academy of Architecture, Bulgarian NGO & NPO
 International Academy of Astronautics, Swedish NGO
 International Actuarial Association, worldwide association of  actuarial associations
 International Advertising Association, international marketing industry association
 International Association of Art
 International Astrostatistics Association
 Investment Adviser Association
 Israeli Astronomical Association

State institutions
 Instituto Antártico Argentino, Argentine Antarctic Institute: federal agency for Antarctic research
 Israel Antiquities Authority, Israeli governmental authority

Other uses
 Id al Adha, Muslim holiday
 Intelligence Authorization Act (1991 - U.S.)
 Islamic Army of Aden, militant group designated as a terrorist organization by Bahrain, Canada and the UK